G1 Supercard was a professional wrestling supershow co-produced by the American Ring of Honor (ROH) and Japanese New Japan Pro-Wrestling (NJPW) promotions. It was the 13th annual Supercard of Honor event and took place on April 6, 2019, at Madison Square Garden in New York City, New York. The event was streamed live on Honor Club, New Japan Pro-Wrestling World, FITE TV, and broadcast live on traditional pay-per-view outlets. It is the final Supercard of Honor to be produced under Sinclair ownership.

The card featured 12 matches. Both the IWGP Heavyweight Championship and ROH World Championship were defended on the card, as IWGP Champion Jay White 
defended against New Japan Cup winner Kazuchika Okada, while Survival of the Fittest winner Marty Scurll and Matt Taven wrestled for the ROH World Title against champion Jay Lethal in a ladder match. The event's undercard saw two Winner Take All matches between NJPW and ROH champions, and UK partner promotion Revolution Pro Wrestling (RPW) had its top title - the British Heavyweight Championship - defended as well.

Production

Background
In June 2018, it was officially announced that Ring of Honor and New Japan Pro-Wrestling would be running a show at Madison Square Garden. One month later, it was reported that the event would have been canceled due to interference by WWE. The issues were eventually resolved and tickets went on sale for the event in August. During the pre-sale, 60% of tickets were sold, with the remaining of the 15,000 tickets selling within 16 minutes of going on sale. The G1 Supercard was the first professional wrestling event at Madison Square Garden by a promotion not owned by the McMahon family since November 14, 1960.

Storylines
G1 Supercard featured professional wrestling matches that involve different wrestlers from pre-existing feuds and storylines. Wrestlers portrayed villains, heroes, or less distinguishable characters in the scripted events that built tension and culminated in a wrestling match or series of matches.

At The New Beginning in Osaka, Jay White defeated Hiroshi Tanahashi to win the IWGP Heavyweight Championship for the first time. It was announced the following day that White will make his first title defense at G1 Supercard against the winner of the New Japan Cup. On March 24, Kazuchika Okada would defeat Sanada in the finals of the New Japan Cup to earn the opportunity to face White for the IWGP Heavyweight Championship at the G1 Supercard, a rematch of Wrestle Kingdom 13, where White defeated Okada.

On the second night of the Honor Rising: Japan 2019 supershow, the Guerrillas of Destiny (Tama Tonga and Tanga Loa) won the IWGP Tag Team Championship for the fifth time, while in the main event ten-time title holders The Briscoe Brothers (Jay Briscoe and Mark Briscoe) successfully defended the ROH World Tag Team Championship. Following the main event match, Jay and Mark Briscoe challenged Tama Tonga and Tanga Loa to a winner takes all match for both of the teams' respective titles at G1 Supercard. The Guerrillas of Destiny then came out, confronting the Briscoes and accepting the challenge. On the following day, NJPW officially announced a match between the IWGP and ROH champions, noting that Jay and Mark Briscoe still had a defense scheduled before the show against Villain Enterprises (PCO and Brody King). King and PCO won the match, the titles, and the G1 Supercard match vs. the Guerrillas of Destiny. The Briscoes and Los Ingobernables de Japón (Sanada and Evil) would later be added to the match to make it a Winner Take All four-way tag team match for the IWGP and ROH Tag Team Titles.

On the NJPW's 47th Anniversary Event, Taiji Ishimori successfully defended the IWGP Junior Heavyweight Championship against Jyushin Thunder Liger. After the match, he issued an open challenge to an ROH wrestler for a match at G1 Supercard. The challenge was accepted by Dragon Lee, representing Mexico's Consejo Mundial de Lucha Libre (CMLL) promotion - a longtime partner of both NJPW and ROH. On the following day, Bandido expressed the intention of joining the title match representing ROH. Later that day, a three-way match for the title was officially announced.

On March 9, it was announced that both ROH and NJPW wrestlers would compete in an Honor Rumble match as part of the G1 Supercard pre-show.

At the G1 Supercard press conference on March 13, it was announced that Marty Scurll - who won the Survival of the Fittest tournament to earn an ROH World Championship match - will invoke his title opportunity at G1 Supercard, where he will face champion Jay Lethal for the title. Two nights later at the ROH 17th Anniversary Show, Lethal and Matt Taven wrestled to a 60-minute time limit draw in a championship match, so Taven was added to the G1 Supercard match, which then became a ladder match.

At Wrestle Kingdom 13, Zack Sabre Jr. defeated Tomohiro Ishii to win the RPW British Heavyweight Championship. In a third round New Japan Cup match, Hiroshi Tanahashi beat Sabre Jr. to advance in the tournament. It was later announced that Zack would defend his British Heavyweight Title against Tanahashi.

In a first round New Japan Cup match, Kota Ibushi defeated the IWGP Intercontinental Champion Tetsuya Naito. Ibushi would then be eliminated from the tournament in his second round matchup against Zack Sabre Jr. Throughout the rest of the tournament Ibushi would face Naito in tag matches with Naito pulling for another match against Ibushi. It was announced that Naito would defend his Intercontinental Title against Ibushi.

Reception
Critics of G1 Supercard mostly praised New Japan Pro-Wrestling's matches and angles while mostly criticizing Ring of Honor's matches and angles. Larry Csonka of 411Mania described G1 Supercard as "...a tale of two shows, with NJPW delivering bangers and a NJPW experience, while ROH failed and opted to trot out The Beautiful People, gave a cold Kenny King another title chance, went too long with Bully Ray, Klein’s title win, and wasted a huge opportunity on the biggest platform possible."

Sean Radican of PWTorch called G1 Supercard a "really good show" saying that, "the ROH portions of the show weren’t very good at all outside of the Ladder match and even that had issues as the crowd didn’t invest much in the match and were really flat for Taven winning. The NJPW matches really delivered big time."

Results

Honor Rumble entrants
Promotion
 – ROH
 – NJPW
 – Free agent
 – Winner

See also
2019 in professional wrestling
List of Ring of Honor pay-per-view events
List of NJPW pay-per-view events

References

2019 in New York City
2019 in professional wrestling
Professional wrestling in New York City
Events in New York City
April 2019 events in the United States
ROH Supercard of Honor
New Japan Pro-Wrestling shows
Madison Square Garden
Professional wrestling joint events